Muttnik may refer to:

 Laika (dog; 1954-1957), the Soviet space dog aboard Sputnik 2, nicknamed by the 1950s American press as "Muttnik"
 Muttnik (mascot), the team mascot for the baseball team Mankato MoonDogs
 "Muttnik" (song), a 1959 song by Count Basie off the album Basie One More Time

See also

 Mutnik, Cazin, Bosnia and Herzegovina
 "Sputniks and Mutniks" (song), a 1982 song off the soundtrack for the film The Atomic Cafe
  (formerly: Nagy-Mutnik, aka "Mutnik"), Constantin Daicoviciu, Caraș-Severin, Romania